At the 1920 Summer Olympics in Antwerp, a single modern pentathlon event was contested. As in 1912, Swedish athletes won all three medals.

Participating nations
A total of 23 athletes from 8 nations competed at the Antwerp Games:

Results

References

 
1920 Summer Olympics events
1920